In enzymology, a riboflavinase is an enzyme that catalyzes the chemical reaction

riboflavin + H2O  ribitol + lumichrome

Thus, the two substrates of this enzyme are riboflavin and H2O, whereas its two products are ribitol and lumichrome.

This enzyme belongs to the family of hydrolases, those acting on carbon-nitrogen bonds other than peptide bonds, specifically in compounds that have not been otherwise categorized within EC number 3.5. The systematic name of this enzyme class is riboflavin hydrolase. This enzyme participates in riboflavin metabolism.

References

 

EC 3.5.99
Enzymes of unknown structure